Daniel Sy Justin (born February 12, 1955) is an American former professional ice hockey defenseman.

Justin played 23 games in the World Hockey Association with the Cincinnati Stingers during the 1975–76 and 1976–77 seasons.

References

External links

1955 births
Living people
American men's ice hockey defensemen
Cincinnati Stingers players
Long Island Cougars players
Springfield Indians players